Hermine Kittel (December 2, 1879 – April 7, 1948) was an Austrian contralto from Vienna. She studied singing with Amalie Materna in Vienna. She made her operatic debut in 1897 in Ljubljana. Kittel first sang under Gustav Mahler at the Vienna Hofoper (Vienna State Opera) and later premiered in a revision of Ariadne auf Naxos. She sang at the Bayreuth Festival in 1902 and 1908, where she sang Erda in Der Ring des Nibelungen. She also sang at the Salzburg Festival, where she often played Marcellina in The Marriage of Figaro.

She was married to opera singer Alexander Haydter.  Her brother Karl Kittel was a conductor.

Films 
 1941: Aufruhr im Damenstift

References 
 David Cummings. "Hermine Kittel", Grove Music Online, ed. L. Macy (accessed January 16, 2007), grovemusic.com  (subscription access).
 Ludwig Eisenberg: Großes biographisches Lexikon der Deutschen Bühne im XIX. Jahrhundert. Verlag von Paul List, Leipzig 1903, S. 509, (Digitalisat).
 Andrea Harrandt: Kittel (verh. Haydter), Hermine. In: Oesterreichisches Musiklexikon. Online-Ausgabe, Wien 2002 ff., ; Druckausgabe: Band 2, Verlag der Österreichischen Akademie der Wissenschaften, Wien 2003, .

External links 
 Hermine Kittel im Bayerischen Musiker-Lexikon Online (BMLO)
 Hermine Kittel bei Operissimo auf der Basis des Großen Sängerlexikons
 Hermine Kittel Auftritte an der Wiener Staatsoper
 
 
 Hermine Kittel und Elise Elizza singen die Barcarole aus Hoffmanns Erzählungen
 Hermine Kittel Tonaufnahme aus dem Archiv der Österreichischen Mediathek: („Doch grausam zeigt sich der Waffen Los“ aus Aida (Oper) mit Elise Elizza)

1879 births
1948 deaths
20th-century Austrian women opera singers
Operatic contraltos
Musicians from Vienna
19th-century Austrian women opera singers